U